In the United States and Canada, a wellness check (also known as a welfare check as well as a Safe and Well check) is an in-person visit from one or more law enforcement officers, especially in response to a request from a friend or family member who is concerned about the person's mental health.

In the United Kingdom, following a request for a "Safe and Well" check, police are required to locate people at risk of harm and seek to manage any safeguarding risks. Police officers are required to establish a person’s location and ascertain whether the individual is alive, breathing and conscious but are limited to finding an individual, calling for medical assessment of people who are found where necessary, and feeding back this information to the person or organisation that has requested the check.

See also 
 House call

References 

Law enforcement
Mental health
Public safety